Sanawrya (Quechua for carrot (from Spanish zanahoria), also spelled Sanabria) is a  mountain in Bolivia. It is located in the Potosí Department, Sud Lípez Province, San Pablo de Lípez Municipality. It lies in the Eduardo Avaroa Andean Fauna National Reserve, northeast of Laguna Colorada.

References 

Mountains of Potosí Department